Lay Your Hands on Me is the fourth and final studio album by Art Porter Jr.  Lay Your Hands on Me was produced by Chuckii Booker, and was recorded at Siide FX Studios and mixed at AmerRaycan Studios by Raymundo Silva. The album has been described as a tribute to Chicago. It was described by Allmusic as "smoother than should be legal".

Track listing
"Flight Time"
"Lake Shore Drive" (featuring Lalah Hathaway)
"One More Chance" (featuring Brian McKnight)
"Just Wanna Be With You"
"DB Blue"
"Candelights"
"Wishful Thinking"
"Forever Love" (featuring Brian McKnight)
"We Are One"
"Lay Your Hands On Me"

References

Art Porter Jr. albums
1994 albums
Verve Records albums